Constructed in 1998, Windpark Holtriem is one of the largest European windfarms, comprising thirty-three Enercon E-66 wind turbines.  Holtriem is a low-lying area adjacent to the North Sea in East Frisia (Lower Saxony, Germany).

It can be reached by 297 stairs.

See also

List of towers

References

External links
 http://wind.wolfgang-janssen.de
 
 http://skyscraperpage.com/diagrams/?b57804

Wind farms in Germany
Buildings and structures in Lower Saxony
Economy of Lower Saxony